Noëmi Nadelmann (born 6 March 1962) is a Swiss soprano with a wide repertoire, ranging from Baroque opera to contemporary works.

Career
Nadelmann was born in Zürich; her mother, Rachel, was an actress, her father, Leo (1913–1998), a pianist and composer. Nadelmann started her singing studies at the Zürich Conservatory, then continued at Indiana University Bloomington. She debuted in 1987 as Musetta in La bohème at La Fenice in Venice.

Engagements at the Vienna Volksoper and various Swiss cities followed. From 1990 until 1994 she was a member of the Staatstheater am Gärtnerplatz in Munich. Subsequent freelance appearances include the Komische Oper Berlin, Zürich Opera House, Bern Theatre, Opéra Bastille in Paris, Hamburg State Opera, Prinzregententheater in Munich, Deutsche Oper Berlin, the Metropolitan Opera in New York, Lyric Opera of Chicago, Cologne Opera, Berlin State Opera, De Nederlandse Opera, and the Bolshoi Theatre.

In Andrzej Żuławskis 1991 film  Nadelmann plays the role of the opera singer Pauline Viardot. She sang Violetta in Götz Friedrich's televised production of La traviata.

In 2010, Nadelmann entered a competition, Battle of the Choirs, on the Swiss television station SRF with the group she founded, Noëmi Nadelmann und Chor. Nadelmann and the group have then continued to perform concerts.

In January 2014, she announced that she and Lyndon Terracini had resumed a relationship that was interrupted 23 years before and that she would move to Australia. She did, and they married in 2019.

Discography 
 Nadelmann singt Gershwin und Porter, 1999
 Opern-Arien, 1999/2000
 Arte Nova Voices – Franz Schreker (Lieder), with Andreas Schmidt (baritone), 2000
 Komm mit mir ins Chambre Séparée, 2006
 Zarzuela: Spanish Arias, 2006
 Mein blaues Klavier – Schweizer Lieder, 2010, song cycles by Leo Nadelmann, Ernest Bloch, Friedrich Hegar,  and Willy Burkhard

References

External links
 
 
 Noëmi Nadelmann and Choir
 
 Interview, Classicpoint.ch 

1962 births
Musicians from Zürich
Indiana University Bloomington alumni
Swiss operatic sopranos
Living people
20th-century Swiss women singers
21st-century Swiss women singers